The derby is a cocktail composed of gin, peach bitters and mint leaves.

Other cocktails are known by the same name.

See also
List of cocktails

References

Cocktails with gin
Cocktails with bitters